Domenico Valentino (born 17 May 1984 in Marcianise) is a boxer from Italy.

The hard punching Valentino won a bronze medal at lightweight at the 2004 European Amateur Boxing Championships in Pula, Croatia.

He participated in the 2004 Summer Olympics. There he was stopped in the quarterfinals of the Lightweight (60 kg) division by Kazakhstan's eventual bronze medalist Serik Yeleuov.

At the 2005 World Amateur Boxing Championships he once more won bronze.

At the Euro 2006 he lost early to Olexandr Klyuchko 18:30.

At the 2007 World Amateur Boxing Championships he at last made it to the finals beating North Korean Kim Song-Guk but lost to Frankie Gavin.

At the 2008 Olympics he beat Tahar Tamsamani but lost to Cuban favorite Yordenis Ugás 2:10.

At the 2009 World Amateur Boxing Championships he used the absence of Gavin (who had turned professional) and Ugas (who had gone up in weight) and home advantage to win his first major title.

At the 2012 Olympics, he again reached the quarter-finals, losing to eventual bronze medalist Evaldas Petrauskas.

Valentino has signed up for the new AIBA professional league, called APB (AIBA Pro-Boxing), which will launch in autumn 2013.

Amateur results
2004 Athens Olympic Games
1st round bye
Defeated Mohammed Asheri (Iran) 37-18
Lost to Serik Yeleuov (Kazakhstan) 23-29

2007 AIBA World Amateur championships
Defeated Luis Ernesto Rueda (Argentina) RSC 3 (1:43)
Defeated Daijiro Hoshi (Japan) 27-9
Defeated Eric Donovan (Ireland) 29-12
Defeated Hrachik Javakhyan (Armenia) 27-12
Defeated Kim Song-Guk (North Korea) 22-14
Lost to Frankie Gavin (England) 10-18

2009 AIBA World Amateur championships

References

External links
 
 
 
 
Yahoo! Sports
2009 WorldChamps

1984 births
Living people
Lightweight boxers
Boxers at the 2004 Summer Olympics
Boxers at the 2008 Summer Olympics
Boxers at the 2012 Summer Olympics
Olympic boxers of Italy
People from Marcianise
Sportspeople from the Province of Caserta
Italian male boxers
AIBA World Boxing Championships medalists
Mediterranean Games gold medalists for Italy
Competitors at the 2005 Mediterranean Games
Competitors at the 2009 Mediterranean Games
Mediterranean Games medalists in boxing
Boxers of Fiamme Oro